Masque is an American metal band.

History

1980s 
Masque is an American rock band formed in Hollywood California in April 1985. Masque performed live for the first time on July 18, 1985 at the Troubadour night club in West Hollywood California. Masque was formed by lead-vocalist Tony Kelly after he departed Hollywood based band Network featuring Drew Forsyth (musician), drummer of the original Quiet Riot with guitarist Randy Rhoads. The name Masque along with the bands elaborate costumes and stage artwork were influenced by the festive courtly entertainment which flourished in sixteenth and early seventeenth century Europe commonly known as a Masque. Between 1985 and 1989 the band performed live and recorded 16 songs that were never officially released to the public until 2008.

2008 to Present 
In March 2008 Masque released a CD titled Face First on Suncity Records featuring 11 songs recorded between 1985 & 1988. Fueled by social media exposure, the band experienced a major resurgence in popularity with fans around the world. Renewed popularity led to a Masque reunion in 2010 to record their first single in twenty years titled “Body Mind & Soul” produced by Grammy-winning record producer Keith Olsen and music video filmed by award-winning director Mark Jacobs. Masque released the second single and video titled "Rock n Roll Dog" on April 30, 2012 also produced by Keith Olsen and directed by Mark Jacobs. The current members of Masque are involved in various projects outside the band including Scotty Kormos who is the house drummer for The Singing Bee (U.S. game show). On May 5, 2011 vocalist Tony Kelly was inducted in the Las Vegas Rock Reunion Hall of Fame with Belladonna, a local Las Vegas band who he fronted and was lead singer between 1979 and 1981.

Discography
Face First (Suncity Records, 2008)

References

External links
Official Homepage

Musical groups established in 1985
1985 establishments in California